The 1962 Brabantse Pijl was the second edition of the Brabantse Pijl cycle race and was held on 5 April 1962. The race started and finished in  Brussels. The race was won by Ludo Janssens.

General classification

References

1962
Brabantse Pijl